The sky-blue poison frog (Hyloxalus azureiventris) is a species of poison dart frog. It is endemic to Peru  and known from the lower eastern versant of the Andes in the upper Amazon basin of the San Martín Region.

Habitat and ecology 
The species habitat is primarily lowland tropical rainforests as well as inland wetlands of Peru. Little is known about the species' adaptability to modified habitats. The sky-blue poison frog lays its eggs under leaf litter found in its habitat. The larvae are then transported to small streams to hatch.

Taxonomy
The species has been placed in numerous genera, including the new genus Cryptophyllobates erected for it. However, it is now placed in Hyloxalus; although Hyloxalus azureiventris represents a distinct clade within Hyloxalus, recognizing it formally would render the rest of Hyloxalus paraphyletic.

Description
Its main distinguishing feature is dorsolateral stripes that run down the back and end on the posterior.

Conservation status and threats 
Due to the decreasing population of sky-blue poison frogs, the species is ranked as endangered by the IUCN. The major threat to the species is habitat loss resulting from human residential and commercial development.

References

azureiventris
Amphibians of the Andes
Amphibians of Peru
Endemic fauna of Peru
Amphibians described in 1985